The Federal Protective Service, or the Federal Guard Service of the Russian Federation, official name in English Federal Guard Service of the Russian Federation, is a federal government agency concerned with the tasks related to the protection of several high-ranking state officials, mandated by the relevant law, including the President of Russia, as well as certain federal properties. It traces its origin to the USSR's Ninth Chief Directorate of the KGB and later Presidential Security Service (SBP) led by KGB general Alexander Korzhakov.

On May 27, 1996, the law "On State Protection" reorganized the GUO (Glavnoye Upravlenie Okhrani) into the FSO (Federal Protection Service). Under article 7 of the law, "the President of the Russian Federation, while in office, shall not be allowed to forgo state protection."

FSO includes the Russian Presidential Security Service. This president's personal security is directed by Viktor Zolotov who, according to Sergei Tretiakov, also supervises the entire FSO. The FSO includes an estimated 50,000 troops and controls the "black box" that can be used in the event of nuclear war. It reportedly uses advanced domestic technical developments.

Structure and command
Since May 18, 2000 and until May 26, 2016 the agency was headed by General Evgeny Murov; since May 26, 2016 the head of the service is General Dmitry Kochnev. The FSO has roughly 50,000 uniformed personnel plus several thousand plainclothed personnel and controls the Cheget that can be used in the event of global nuclear war. It also operates a secure communications system for senior government officials. The FSO is a powerful institution with a range of rights and powers, including the right to conduct searches and surveillance without warrants, make arrests, and give orders to other state agencies.

The FSO is organized into the following services:

 Management (Director, Deputies)
 Presidential Security Service
 Security Service
 Commandant's Office of the Moscow Kremlin
 Kremlin Regiment
 Regiment HQ
 Presidential Band of the Russian Federation
 1st Battalion
 2nd Battalion
 3rd Battalion
 Presidential Cavalry Escort Battalion
 4th Operational Reserve Battalion
 Special Communications Service of Russia
 Engineering Support Service
 Housekeeping Service
 Special Purpose Garage
 Administrative service
 Security service in the North-West Federal District (St. Petersburg)
 Security service in the Caucasus (Sochi)
 Security service in Crimea (Simferopol)
 Office of central subordination
 Units of the FSO at official residences 
 Office of Special Communications and Information in the Federal Districts
 Centers of special communications and information 
 Special communications centers 
 Educational and research institutions, federal unitary enterprises
 Academy of the Federal Security Service of Russia (Oryol)
 Public Relations Center

One of the FSO units is the Kremlin Regiment. A more recent addition to the FSO infrastructure is the Special Communications Service of Russia (Spetsviaz) which was incorporated as a structural sub unit on August 7, 2004.

History of the federal protective services
 Special department by VChK College
 Special department of GPU
 Special department by OGPU College – Dec 1929
 5th department (special safeguard) of Operod, SOU OGPU, Jan 1930 – Mar 1931
 5th department (special safeguard) of Operod, SOU OGPU, Mar–Jun 1931
 4th department of Operod, OGPU, Jun 1931
 Operod of OGPU
 Operative division (Operod) of GUGB NKVD USSR, Jul 1934 – Nov 1936
 Division of safeguard by GUGB NKVD USSR, Dec 1936 – Jun 1938
 Department of Moscow Kremlin's commandant, NKVD USSR
 1st division of 1st Department by NKVD USSR, Jun–Sep 1938
 1st division of GUGB
 1st division of NKGB
 Department of Moscow Kremlin's commandant, NKGB USSR
 1st division of NKVD
 Department of Moscow Kremlin's commandant, NKVD USSR
 Sixth department of NKGB USSR, Apr 1943 – Mar 1946
 Department of Moscow Kremlin's commandant, NKGB USSR
 Sixth department of MGB USSR, Mar–Apr 1946
 Department of safeguard No. 1, MGB, Apr–Dec 1946
 Department of safeguard No. 2, MGB, Apr–Dec 1946
 Department of Moscow Kremlin's commandant, MGB USSR, Dec 1946
 Headquarters of safeguard, MGB USSR, Dec 1946 – May 1952
 Department of safeguard, MGB, May 1952
 Ninth department of MVD USSR, Mar 1953 – Mar 1954
 Tenth department of MVD USSR, Mar 1953 – Mar 1954
 Ninth department of KGB by SM USSR, Mar 1954 –
 Tenth department of KGB by SM USSR, Mar 1954 –
 Fifteenth department of KGB by SM USSR
 Ninth department of KGB USSR
 Fifteenth department of KGB USSR
 Service of safeguard, KGB USSR
 Department of safeguard by USSR President
 Main Administration of Protection (GUO – Glavnoye Upravlenie Okhrani) (1992–1996)
 Federal Protective Service (FSO) (1996–today)

List of leaders

Heads of the GUO/Directors of the FSO
 Vladimir Redkoborody (1991 – June 1992)
 Mikhail Barsukov (12 June 1992 – 24 July 1995)
 Yuri Krapivin (24 July 1995 – 18 May 2000)
 Yevgeny Murov (18 May 2000 – 26 May 2016)
 General Dmitry Kochnev (since 26 May 2016)

Deputy Directors of the FSO
 Oleg Klimentyev (First Deputy Director since 2015)
 Vladimir Belanovsky – Head of the Services of Special Communications and Information
 Alexey Rubezhnoy – Head of the Presidential Security Service
 Victor Tulupov
 Major General Sergey Udovenko – Commandant of the Moscow Kremlin

See also
 Presidential Security Service (SBP)
 Federal Security Service (FSB)
 Kremlin Regiment
 Spetssvyaz
 FAPSI
 Awards of the Federal Protective Service of the Russian Federation
 U.S. Secret Service
 Household Division § United Kingdom

References

External links

 Official website
 Protection of the president

1996 establishments in Russia
Government agencies established in 1996
Federal law enforcement agencies of Russia
Russian intelligence agencies
Protective security units